Donkin may refer to:

Donkin, Nova Scotia, an unincorporated community in Nova Scotia
Donkin (surname), the English-language surname
Mount Donkin, a mountain in British Columbia